Ignas Brasevičius (born 21 September 1984) is a Lithuanian long distance runner. He competed in the men's marathon at the 2017 World Championships in Athletics. In 2018, he competed in the men's marathon at the 2018 European Athletics Championships held in Berlin, Germany. He finished in 40th place. In 2020, he competed in the men's race at the 2020 World Athletics Half Marathon Championships held in Gdynia, Poland.

References

External links

1984 births
Living people
Lithuanian male long-distance runners
Lithuanian male marathon runners
World Athletics Championships athletes for Lithuania
Place of birth missing (living people)